A.J. Monty White is a British young Earth creationist and was formerly the Chief Executive of the UK branch of Answers in Genesis. White is a graduate of the University of Wales; he obtained a BSc in Chemistry in 1967 and in 1970 earned his PhD for research in the kinetic theory of gas from Aberystwyth University.

Biography
White was brought up by his parents as an atheist, he later became a theistic evolutionist after studying geology. He later changed his position after studying the Bible, saying evolution is not compatible with Christianity, and became a young Earth creationist.

White states that "evolution is not compatible with Christianity," and believes the earth is about 6,000 years old and that "people believe in evolution because they choose to do so." Furthermore, he says "there is not a shred of real evidence for the evolution of life on earth."

In his autobiographical paper "My spiritual pilgrimage from theistic evolution to Creation," White says:

In his 1985 book How Old is the Earth?, White said that any evidence which shows that the Earth is older than the Bible is superficial and misleading. White says the theory of evolution is linked to immorality. In a British Broadcasting Corporation interview he said, "If you tell people they're animals, they'll behave like animals".

Radiometric dating
White accepts the general validity of carbon-14 dating for the last five thousand years but not beyond.

Works 
 What About Origins, Dunestone Printers Limited (1978) 
 The Scientific Case for Creation, Heath Christian Trust (1984) 
 How Old is the Earth?, (1985) 
 Wonderfully Made, Evangelical Press (1989) 
 Why I Believe in Creation, Evangelical Press (1994)

See also 
 Flood geology
 Duane Gish

References

Year of birth missing (living people)
Living people
Alumni of the University of Wales
British evangelicals
Converts to Protestantism from atheism or agnosticism
Christian Young Earth creationists
Former theistic evolutionists
Leaders of Christian parachurch organizations